Căprioara may refer to several places in Romania:

 Căprioara, a village in Săvârșin Commune, Arad County
 Căprioara, a village in Recea-Cristur Commune, Cluj County
 Căprioara, a village in Hamcearca Commune, Tulcea County
 Căprioara, a tributary of the river Priboiasa in Vâlcea County

See also
Capra (disambiguation)